D.A. Wallach (also known as D.A.) is an American musician and business executive. He is the former lead singer of the group Chester French and is currently a solo artist signed by Harvest Records, a subsidiary of Capitol Records. He is the former artist-in-residence at Spotify, a company where he was an early investor. As a business executive, he has invested in and advised several companies that have included SpaceX, Emulate, Synthego, Beam Therapeutics, Glympse Bio, Ligandal and Ripple.

Early life and education
He was born David-Andrew Wallach in Denver, Colorado, and moved to Appleton, Wisconsin, before he was two years old. He attended the University School of Milwaukee, where he was a two-time national finalist in the Federal Reserve's Fed Challenge monetary policy competition.

Wallach went on to attend Harvard University. During his time at Harvard, he studied African-American studies under Henry Louis Gates Jr. and graduated in 2007, receiving both the Alain Locke Prize for the most outstanding scholar in African-American Studies and the Andrew Ramroop prize. He received Harvard's first certificate in the Bantu language Gikuyu. While at Harvard, he auditioned against future Academy Award-winning director Damien Chazelle for the role of drummer in future Academy Award-winning composer Justin Hurwitz's band; Chazelle won and Wallach became the lead singer.

Career

Early career and Chester French

He was initially discovered by Kanye West, Jermaine Dupri and Pharrell Williams while he was attending Harvard and leading the band Chester French. Wallach's music style of classic pop has been compared to musicians such as The Beatles and The Beach Boys.

Wallach co-founded the group Chester French in 2003 with Harvard schoolmate Maxwell Drummey. Wallach worked as a recording engineer in Harvard's student recording studio, engineering and producing for Boston-area jazz musicians and working on Chester French's debut album at night. In 2007, Wallach sent out hundreds of demo CDs which led to a bidding war between West, Dupri, and Williams. Just prior to Wallach's graduating from Harvard, Williams signed the group to his Star Trak Entertainment label, a partnership with Interscope Records. The group was known for being one of the first bands to use Facebook as a promotional tool to interact with fans being freshmen at Harvard the same year that the site was launched by Mark Zuckerberg. He was also an early adopter of Twitter with over one million followers. During his time with Chester French, Wallach toured with bands such as N*E*R*D, Blink 182, and Weezer. The group's first album included the single She Loves Everybody which reached #1 on U.S. Billboard Hot Dance Singles Sales and #2 on U.S. Billboard Hot Singles Sales.

Chester French released two albums under the StarTrak record label, leaving in 2010 to release its third album independently. The third album featured collaborations with Williams, Pusha T, and Travis Barker.

Solo career, collaborations, and film

Outside of Chester French, Wallach has worked with Supa Dups, forming the group D.A. & the Supa Dups. They collaborated in 2011 and released 2 singles, Who Do You Know and Too Cool (feat. Vybz Kartel). Wallach originally met Supa Dups while he was doing studio work in Los Angeles. He also wrote and sang the hook for the song Play Your Part with Rick Ross, Wale, and Meek Mill in 2011. The song was a single on the first Maybach Music Album, and Wallach also appeared in the 2011 music video for the song.

He appeared in the 2012 film Artifact produced by Jared Leto. The film was a documentary about Leto's band Thirty Seconds to Mars, its lawsuit against Virgin EMI Records, and the making of the album This Is War. Wallach also worked with Pharrell Williams to co-write the song The Way It Is (Vector's Theme), a song on the soundtrack for the 2010 film Despicable Me.

In 2013, Wallach began writing and recording music as a solo artist. He played his music for Odd Future and Frank Ocean manager Chris Clancy, who then partnered with Harvest Records to release Wallach's solo project. He released his first single, entitled Glowing, in October 2013, which debuted in a music video directed by Tyler, The Creator. The video was originally released "anonymously" before Wallach came out as the singer of the song in an interview with MTV, who called it a "Beatles-esque love song." When asked why he released the video anonymously, Wallach stated that he just wanted people to enjoy the song. Wallach followed up with his second solo release, Farm, in November 2013.

In 2016, Wallach had a small role in the musical film La La Land, working with former Harvard classmates and bandmates Damien Chazelle and Justin Hurwitz.

Business career
In 2011, Wallach was selected by Sean Parker, Shakil Khan, and Daniel Ek to be the official artist-in-residence for Spotify. In that capacity, he created and led the Artist Services team, which oversaw the company's relationships with musicians and managers, discussing how the service works, its payment model, and promotions. He has also driven different products for the company including its Artist Analytics dashboard and its merchandise and ticketing products. He has advocated publicly for subscription music services to be embraced by both artists and the music industry. Spotify's subscribers grew from one million to 20 million prior to him leaving the company in 2015.

Wallach has invested in and advised technology companies that have included Fancy, digital currency network Ripple, and telemedicine innovator Doctor On Demand. Wallach partnered with billionaire Ron Burkle in 2016 to form Inevitable Venture, a venture fund based in Los Angeles. He initially met Burkle through at a Grammy party and helped him invest in Spotify.

Other investments by Wallach have included SpaceX and Emulate.

Discography

Studio albums

Singles

Collaborations
For discography of Wallach as lead vocalist of Chester French, see main article on Chester French.

Filmography

Awards and recognition
Wallach made Forbes' list of 30 Under 30 in music in 2011. He was also named one of the 100 Most Creative People in Business by Fast Company in 2013.

References

External links

 D.A. Official Website
 D.A. News Articles

1985 births
Living people
American male musicians
American male pop singers
Harvest Records artists
Harvard University alumni
University School of Milwaukee alumni